
Las Habras Lake is a lake in the Beni Department, Bolivia. At an elevation of 136 m, its surface area is 73 km².

References

Lakes of Beni Department